Neocollyris is a genus of beetles in the family Cicindelidae, in the tribe Collyridini.

Species
Carabidae of the World and GBIF list:

 Neocollyris acrolia (Chaudoir, 1860)
 Neocollyris acuteapicalis (Horn, 1913)
 Neocollyris acutilabris Naviaux, 1994
 Neocollyris aenea Naviaux, 1994
 Neocollyris aeneicollis Naviaux and Cassola, 2005
 Neocollyris affinis (Horn, 1892)
 Neocollyris albitarsipennis (Horn, 1925)
 Neocollyris albitarsis (Erichson, 1834)
 Neocollyris albocyanescens (Horn, 1912)
 Neocollyris ampullacea (Horn, 1901)
 Neocollyris ampullicollis (Horn, 1913)
 Neocollyris andrewesi (Horn, 1894)
 Neocollyris angularis (Horn, 1892)
 Neocollyris angustula Naviaux, 1994
 Neocollyris annulicornis Naviaux, 2004
 Neocollyris anthracina Naviaux, 1994
 Neocollyris aptera (Lund, 1790)
 Neocollyris apteroides (Horn, 1901)
 Neocollyris arnoldi (Macleay, 1825)
 Neocollyris assamensis Naviaux, 1994
 Neocollyris attenuata (Redtenbacher, 1848)
 Neocollyris aureofusca (Bates, 1889)
 Neocollyris auripennis (Horn, 1902)
 Neocollyris basilana Naviaux, 1994
 Neocollyris batesi (Horn, 1892)
 Neocollyris bicolor (Horn, 1902)
 Neocollyris biimpressa (Harn, 1937)
 Neocollyris bipartita (Fleutiaux, 1897)
 Neocollyris bonellii (Guerin-Meneville, 1834)
 Neocollyris brancuccii Naviaux, 1992
 Neocollyris brendelli Naviaux, 1994
 Neocollyris brevicula Naviaux, 1994
 Neocollyris brevipronotalis (Horn, 1929)
 Neocollyris brevis Naviaux, 1994
 Neocollyris brevithoracica (Horn, 1913)
 Neocollyris bryanti (Horn, 1922)
 Neocollyris buchardi Naviaux, 2008
 Neocollyris carbonaria Naviaux, 1992
 Neocollyris carinifrons (Horn, 1901)
 Neocollyris celebensis (Chaudoir, 1860)
 Neocollyris ceylonica (Chaudoir, 1864)
 Neocollyris chaudoiri (Horn, 1892)
 Neocollyris chloroptera (Chaudoir, 1860)
 Neocollyris clavipalpis (Horn, 1901)
 Neocollyris coapteroides (Horn, 1935)
 Neocollyris cognata Naviaux, 2004
 Neocollyris compacta Naviaux, 1994
 Neocollyris compressicollis (Horn, 1909)
 Neocollyris conspicua Naviaux, 1994
 Neocollyris constricticollis (Horn, 1909)
 Neocollyris contracta (Horn, 1905)
 Neocollyris convergentefrontalis (Horn, 1923)
 Neocollyris corrugata Naviaux, 1992
 Neocollyris crassicornis (Dejean, 1825)
 Neocollyris cruentata (Schmidt-Goebel, 1846)
 Neocollyris cyaneipalpis Horn, 1923)
 Neocollyris cylindripennis (Chaudoir, 1864)
 Neocollyris davidi Naviaux, 1994
 Neocollyris deuvei Naviaux, 1991
 Neocollyris diardi (Latreille, 1822)
 Neocollyris dimidiata (Chaudoir, 1864)
 Neocollyris discretegrossesculpta (Horn, 1942)
 Neocollyris distans Naviaux, 1994
 Neocollyris distincta (Chaudoir, 1860)
 Neocollyris dohertyi (Horn, 1895)
 Neocollyris egregia Naviaux, 2004
 Neocollyris elongata (Chaudoir, 1864)
 Neocollyris emarginata (Dejean, 1825)
 Neocollyris erichsoni (Horn, 1892)
 Neocollyris erichwerneri Naviaux & Schule, 2008
 Neocollyris fasciata (Chaudoir, 1864)
 Neocollyris feai (Horn, 1893)
 Neocollyris filicornis (Horn, 1895)
 Neocollyris flava Naviaux, 1994
 Neocollyris fleutiauxi (Horn, 1892)
 Neocollyris formosana (Bates, 1866)
 Neocollyris foveifrons (Horn, 1901)
 Neocollyris fowleri Naviaux, 1994
 Neocollyris fruhstorferi (Horn, 1902)
 Neocollyris fuscitarsis (Schmidt-Goebel, 1846)
 Neocollyris glabrogibbosa (Horn, 1929)
 Neocollyris globosa Naviaux, 1994
 Neocollyris gomyi Naviaux, 2008
 Neocollyris gracilicornis (Horn, 1895)
 Neocollyris graciliformis Mandl, 1982
 Neocollyris gracilis (Horn, 1894)
 Neocollyris grandisubtilis (Horn, 1935)
 Neocollyris hiekei Naviaux, 1994
 Neocollyris horni Naviaux, 1994
 Neocollyris horsfieldi (Macleay, 1825)
 Neocollyris impressifrons (Chaudoir, 1864)
 Neocollyris infusca Naviaux, 1994
 Neocollyris ingridae Naviaux, 2004
 Neocollyris insignis (Chaudoir, 1864)
 Neocollyris jendeki Naviaux, 2004
 Neocollyris juengeri Naviaux, 1992
 Neocollyris kabakovi Naviaux & Matalin, 2003
 Neocollyris karen Naviaux, 2004
 Neocollyris kollari (Horn, 1901)
 Neocollyris kraatzi (Horn, 1892)
 Neocollyris krausei Naviaux, 1992
 Neocollyris labiomaculata (Horn, 1892)
 Neocollyris labiopalpalis (Horn, 1932)
 Neocollyris lepida Naviaux, 2004
 Neocollyris leucodactyla (Chaudoir, 1860)
 Neocollyris levigata (Horn, 1894)
 Neocollyris linearis (Schmidt-Goebel, 1846)
 Neocollyris lissodera (Chaudoir 1864)
 Neocollyris longipes Naviaux and Cassola, 2005
 Neocollyris loochooensis (Kano, 1929)
 Neocollyris lucidipes Naviaux, 2008: 129
 Neocollyris lugubris (Van der Linden, 1829)
 Neocollyris macilenta Naviaux, 2004
 Neocollyris maindroni (Horn, 1905)
 Neocollyris major (Latreille, 1822)
 Neocollyris mannheimsi (Mandl, 1954)
 Neocollyris metallica Naviaux, 2004
 Neocollyris modica Naviaux, 1994
 Neocollyris moesta (Schmidt-Goebel, 1846)
 Neocollyris moraveci Naviaux, 2004
 Neocollyris mouhoti (Chaudoir, 1864)
 Neocollyris multipilosa Naviaux, 2003
 Neocollyris murzini Naviaux, 1992
 Neocollyris naviauxi Sawada & Wiesner, 2003
 Neocollyris nepalensis Naviaux, 1994
 Neocollyris nilgirica, Fowler, 1912
 Neocollyris nishikawai Naviaux, 2004
 Neocollyris nitida Naviaux, 1994
 Neocollyris oblita Naviaux, 1994
 Neocollyris obscurofemorata Mandl, 1970
 Neocollyris orichalcina (Horn, 1896)
 Neocollyris ovata Naviaux & Sawada, 1993
 Neocollyris pacholatkoi Sawada & Wiesner, 2006
 Neocollyris panfilovi Naviaux & Matalin, 2002
 Neocollyris paradoxa Matalin & Naviaux, 2008
 Neocollyris parallela Naviaux, 1991
 Neocollyris parvula (Chaudoir, 1848)
 Neocollyris pearsoni Naviaux, 1994
 Neocollyris perplexa Naviaux, 1994
 Neocollyris pinguis (Horn, 1894)
 Neocollyris planifrontoides (Horn, 1925)
 Neocollyris plicata (Schaum, 1863)
 Neocollyris plicaticollis (Chaudoir, 1864)
 Neocollyris plicicollis (Horn, 1901)
 Neocollyris prominens Naviaux, 1991
 Neocollyris pseudacrolia (Horn, 1935)
 Neocollyris pseudocontracta (Horn, 1937)
 Neocollyris pseudosignata (Horn, 1902)
 Neocollyris pseudospeciosa (Horn, 1932)
 Neocollyris pulchella Naviaux, 1994
 Neocollyris punctatella (Chaudoir, 1864)
 Neocollyris purpurascens Naviaux, 1992
 Neocollyris purpurea (Horn, 1895)
 Neocollyris purpureomaculata (Horn, 1922)
 Neocollyris quadrisulcata (Horn, 1935)
 Neocollyris rapillyi Naviaux, 1992
 Neocollyris rectangulivertex (Horn, 1929)
 Neocollyris redtenbacheri (Horn, 1894)
 Neocollyris resplendens (Horn, 1902)
 Neocollyris restricta Naviaux, 2008
 Neocollyris rhodopus (Bates, 1878)
 Neocollyris richteri (Horn, 1901)
 Neocollyris rivalieri Naviaux, 1994
 Neocollyris roeschkei (Horn, 1892)
 Neocollyris rogeri Shook & Wu, 2006
 Neocollyris rosea Naviaux, 1994
 Neocollyris rubens (Bates, 1875)
 Neocollyris rufipalpis (Chaudoir, 1864)
 Neocollyris rugata Naviaux, 1994
 Neocollyris rugei (Horn, 1892)
 Neocollyris rugosa (Chaudoir, 1864)
 Neocollyris rugosior (Horn, 1896)
 Neocollyris samosirensis Naviaux, 1994
 Neocollyris saphyrina (Chaudoir, 1850)
 Neocollyris sarawakensis (Thomson, 1857)
 Neocollyris saundersi (Chaudoir, 1864)
 Neocollyris sausai Naviaux, 2004
 Neocollyris sawadai Naviaux, 1991
 Neocollyris schaumi (Horn, 1892)
 Neocollyris schereri Naviaux, 1994
 Neocollyris schillhammeri Naviaux, 2008
 Neocollyris sedlaceki Naviaux, 1994
 Neocollyris semiaenescens (Horn, 1935)
 Neocollyris siamensis Naviaux, 1991
 Neocollyris sichuanensis Naviaux, 1994
 Neocollyris signata (Horn, 1902)
 Neocollyris similior (Horn, 1893)
 Neocollyris similis (Lesne, 1891)
 Neocollyris singularis Naviaux, 1994
 Neocollyris siniaevi Naviaux, 2004
 Neocollyris sinica Naviaux, 2004
 Neocollyris smaragdina (Horn, 1894)
 Neocollyris smithi (Chaudoir, 1864)
 Neocollyris speciosa (Schaum, 1863)
 Neocollyris stiengensis (Horn, 1914)
 Neocollyris strangulata Naviaux, 1991
 Neocollyris stricta Naviaux, 2004
 Neocollyris subclavata (Chaudoir, 1860)
 Neocollyris subtileflavescens (Horn, 1913)
 Neocollyris subtilis (Chaudoir, 1863)
 Neocollyris subtilobscurata Horn, 1925
 Neocollyris sumatrensis (Horn, 1896)
 Neocollyris taiwanensis Naviaux, 2004
 Neocollyris tenuis Naviaux, 1994
 Neocollyris thomsoni (Horn, 1894)
 Neocollyris tricolor Naviaux, 1991
 Neocollyris tuberculata (Macleay, 1825)
 Neocollyris vannideki Naviaux, 1992
 Neocollyris variicornis (Chaudoir, 1864)
 Neocollyris variipalpis (Horn, 1896)
 Neocollyris variitarsis (Chaudoir, 1860)
 Neocollyris venusta Naviaux, 1992
 Neocollyris vietnamensis Mandl, 1970
 Neocollyris vitalisi (W.Horn, 1924)
 Neocollyris wardi Naviaux, 1994
 Neocollyris waterhousei (Chaudoir, 1864)
 Neocollyris werneri Naviaux, 1991
 Neocollyris xanthoscelis (Chaudoir, 1864)
 Neocollyris zerchei Naviaux, 1991

References

External links

 
Cicindelidae